The olive-crowned crescentchest (Melanopareia maximiliani) is a species of bird in the family Melanopareiidae. It is found in Argentina, Bolivia, and Paraguay.

Taxonomy and systematics

The crescentchests (genus Melanopareia) were previously included in family Rhinocryptidae, the tapaculos. A 2010 publication confirmed earlier work and created their present genus. The olive-crowned crescentchest has three subspecies, the nominate Melanopareia maximiliani maximiliani, M. m. argentina, and M. m. pallida. The last has been suggested as a separate species due to vocal differences. In addition, a subpopulation of M. m. pallida might be an undescribed taxon.

Description

The nominate subspecies' crown and upperparts are olive-brown, the throat deep buff, and the chest and belly ochraceous. It has a narrow buff supercilium with a black mask below and a black crescent and chesnut band between the throat and chest. M. m. argentina is similar but has paler underparts. M. m. pallida is paler still, its throat is more cinnamon than buff, and the facial mask is a lighter black.

Distribution and habitat

The nominate subspecies of olive-crowned crescentchest is found in La Paz Department of western Bolivia. M. m. argentina is found from central Bolivia to northwestern Argentina. M. m. pallida is found in southeastern Bolivia, western Paraguay, and northern Argentina. The species generally inhabits dry scrub and grassy areas with small bushes, but M. m. pallida also frequents sawgrass in the Chaco Basin.

Behavior

Feeding

The olive-crowned crescentchest usually forages alone, but sometimes in pairs, by hopping through dense cover on or near the ground. Its diet has not been recorded.

Breeding

In Argentina the olive-crowned crescentchest breeds from September to December; an active nest was found in October in central Bolivia. Two nests of M. m. pallida were cups of vegetable fiber and palm leaves; they were hidden not far above the ground. One nest of M. m. argentina was a tunnel lined with grass. The species' clutch is two or three eggs.

Vocalization

The nominate olive-crowned crescentchest and M. m. argentina have two songs, one described as "chuck" notes  and the other as "chi" notes . The song of M. m. pallida is faster . The species' call is described as "chit chuck" .

Status

The IUCN has assessed the olive-crowned crescentchest as being of Least Concern. It is locally fairly common and in Argentina occurs in several protected areas.

References

olive-crowned crescentchest
Birds of the Gran Chaco
Birds of Paraguay
Birds of the Yungas
olive-crowned crescentchest
Taxonomy articles created by Polbot